Opsaridium engrauloides is a species of ray-finned fish in the family Cyprinidae. It is found the Ubangi in the Central African Republic.

References

Endemic fauna of the Central African Republic
Opsaridium
Fish described in 1923
Fish of the Central African Republic